Kate Marie Nash (born 6 July 1987) is an English singer-songwriter and actress.

Nash launched her music career in 2005. Her 2007 single "Foundations" became a hit and brought her to public attention in the UK. Her debut album, Made of Bricks, peaked at No. 1 in the UK and was a moderate international success. Nash subsequently won the award for Best British Female Artist at the 2008 Brit Awards. Her second studio album, My Best Friend Is You, was released in 2010 and reached the top 10 in the UK and Germany. After her departure from a major label, Nash self-released her third studio album, Girl Talk, in 2013, but it failed to match the commercial success of her previous records. Her fourth and most recent studio album, Yesterday Was Forever, was also released independently in 2018, funded by her fans via a Kickstarter campaign.

Aside from music, Nash has appeared in films such as the drama Greetings from Tim Buckley (2012), the comedy Powder Room (2013), and the comedy-drama Syrup (2013).  She played Rhonda "Britannica" Richardson in the Netflix comedy-drama series GLOW (2017–2019). She is also a feminist activist who campaigns against gender inequality.

Early life 
Kate Marie Nash was born in the London Borough of Harrow in London on 6 July 1987, the second of three daughters born to an English father and Irish mother. Her father, Steve, is a systems analyst, while her mother, Marie (née Walsh), was a hospice nurse. She learned to play the piano at an early age. At 18, she underwent cardiac radiofrequency ablation in order to eliminate tachycardia. The surgery subsequently inspired her song "Death Proof". She attended the BRIT School and originally wanted to study acting, but turned to music after she was rejected from several drama colleges and universities, including the Bristol Old Vic Theatre School. Prior to her musical career, she worked in a River Island shop and a Nando's restaurant.

Career

2005–2008: Career beginnings and Made of Bricks 

Nash embarked on a musical career in 2005, when she started recording after falling down the stairs and breaking her foot, which left her homebound. She started performing live, holding her first shows in pubs, at open mic nights, and an anti-folk festival in Brighton. After several gigs, she uploaded her music to MySpace where she secured a manager and found exposure thanks to support from Lily Allen. Her debut single, featuring songs "Caroline's a Victim" and "Birds", was recorded and produced in Iceland by Valgeir Sigurðsson, and released through Moshi Moshi Records in February 2007. The release was limited to 2,000 copies and available only on 7-inch vinyl. Due to demand, another 1,000 copies were made and these also sold out. CD promo copies were produced for distribution to the press and DJs and are occasionally available for sale. The music video for "Caroline's a Victim" was directed by Kinga Burza and received airplay on MTV2. The song was then included on the CD Moshi Moshi Singles Compilation and the single's B-side, "Birds", later featured on Nash's debut album. Both tracks have also been released on digital music platforms.

In April 2007, Nash was signed to the Polydor offshoot Fiction Records and the following month made her official TV performance debut on Later... with Jools Holland. Her second single, "Foundations", which she co-wrote with producer Paul Epworth, was released by Fiction on 18 June 2007, and reached number two in the official UK Singles Chart. Following this success, the label announced plans to bring forward the release of Nash's debut album Made of Bricks to 6 August 2007. Produced by Paul Epworth, the album included many of the tracks she had been performing during her two nationwide tours. Made of Bricks was leaked to filesharing networks a few days before its official commercial release and subsequently received mixed reviews; The Independent described it as being in "pole position for worst album of the year", while a BBC review called it "an album of surprising verve and variety". It proved, however, to be commercially successful when it entered and peaked on the UK Albums Chart at number 1, and stayed in the chart for over forty consecutive weeks.

During mid-2007, Nash performed at numerous festivals, including the Wireless Festival, Bestival, Electric Gardens, Glastonbury, Latitude, Reading and Leeds, Oxegen and T in the Park. Throughout late 2007 and early 2008, she released three more singles from Made of Bricks. "Mouthwash" and "Pumpkin Soup" both made the Top 40 in the UK Singles Chart. Although her fifth single "Merry Happy" didn't chart well in the UK, the song enjoyed minor success in other countries, including the United States and Canada. Made of Bricks peaked at number 36 on the US Billboard 200 chart in January 2008. It would later be certified Platinum in the UK and Gold in Germany. In February 2008, Nash was honoured with the Best British Female Solo Artist award at the 2008 Brit Awards. She also won the Q Award for Breakthrough Artist and the NME Award for Best Solo Artist. Nash embarked on her first tour in Australia and the US in 2008 and opened the 2008 Glastonbury Festival.

2009–2011: My Best Friend Is You 

In March 2009, Nash became one of the founding members of Featured Artists' Coalition, a nonprofit organization and lobbying group, and revealed that she was in the early stages of recording her second album. She was introduced by her boyfriend Ryan Jarman to Bernard Butler, the producer of Duffy's debut album Rockferry and a former guitarist for Suede. The pair worked on eight songs at RAK Studios in the summer that year. As a side project in late 2009, Kate joined a punk band called The Receeders where she played bass guitar, with Jon Jackson and Brett Alaimo. In December, the band played a live gig at 93 Feet East.

In January 2010, Nash revealed that the album was complete, and the following month the song "I Just Love You More" was made available for free download from her official website. The first official single from the album was "Do-Wah-Doo", which was released on 12 April 2010, to a moderate chart success. Nash's second studio album My Best Friend Is You was released a week later and was met with generally positive reviews. The sound was described as having a girl group approach, influenced by a wide variety of genres, from Wall of Sound, Motown to no wave and riot grrrl. The album reached the top 10 on the charts in the UK and Germany, and met with moderate success elsewhere. Two further singles from the album, "Kiss That Grrrl" and "Later On", were released in 2010, but failed to chart. To promote the record, the singer embarked on a tour, beginning with nine dates in North America in late April, with the all-female travelling festival Lilith Fair. Her opening act was Supercute!, a psychedelic pop teen girl trio from New York City. She also took part in the 2010 V Festival. In August Nash performed in Australia at Melbourne's Corner Hotel and Sydney's Metro Theatre. In February 2011, her concerts in Rio de Janeiro and São Paulo were the first contact with her Brazilian fans. The singer declared the Rio show "the best concert of her life" and "the happiest place she has ever been".

After Fiction Records terminated her contract, Nash launched her own record label, Have 10p Records. Indie act Brigitte Aphrodite (who had toured with Kate on many occasions) was the first artist signed to the label and released the debut single "I Dream Myself Awake" in 2011. Nash also appeared in Supercute!'s music video "Dumb Dumbs" and helped to produce their first album which eventually could not be released due to the band's split-up. Later in 2011, she launched the Kate Nash's Rock 'n' Roll for Girls After School Music Club as a platform to inspire teenage girls to get into songwriting and making their own music, due to the shortage of female artists in the UK. On her UK tour that year, Nash promoted the initiative in schools such as the City of Portsmouth Girls' School, Woodchurch High School and John Madejski Academy.

2012–2015: Change of musical direction and Girl Talk 

In February 2012, Nash wrote and recorded a song with some of the Occupy London protesters camping outside the St Paul's Cathedral, following workshops led by her and Sam Duckworth of Get Cape. Wear Cape. Fly. She contributed the song "My Chinchilla" to the Nardwuar and The Evaporators' album Busy Doing Nothing!. She also collaborated with Brisbane-based band The Thin Kids which resulted in the single "The Thin Kids Theme" released on her label and wrote the song "I Am Me" with Willow Smith, which was released later in 2012.

In June 2012, Nash embarked on a 12-date Faster Pussycat Run Run Tour across the UK and released a new song, "Under-Estimate the Girl", for free on her website as an intro to her third studio album. The punk and grunge-influenced song, which Nash wrote, recorded and made a video for in under 24 hours, received mostly negative feedback. As a fan of Buffy the Vampire Slayer, Kate staged a play based on the season six musical episode "Once More, with Feeling" at Hackney Picturehouse. In November, her EP Death Proof was released. She had a small role in Greetings from Tim Buckley, a film about Tim and Jeff Buckley, which premiered at the 2012 Toronto International Film Festival. She also appeared in films Syrup and Powder Room, released the following year. She was featured on Watsky's song "Hey, Asshole" from his 2013 album Cardboard Castles.

Kate's third full-length studio album, Girl Talk, was released on 4 March 2013, independently through Have 10p Records. It featured a heavier, rock and grunge-influenced sound, and was a noticeable departure from her first two indie pop albums. Lyrically, it drew a lot of influence from the riot grrrl movement and explored the themes of feminism and female empowerment. The album was financed through a crowdfunding campaign on PledgeMusic and recorded in Los Angeles. Girl Talk received mixed to positive reviews and was a minor commercial success. It was supported by singles "3AM", "OMYGOD!" and "Fri-End?", but none of them made an impact on the charts. Nash promoted the album by extensively touring Europe and the Americas. In late 2013, she released a Christmas EP Have Faith with Kate Nash This Christmas with The Tuts.

In 2014, Nash performed at the Coachella and Lollapalooza festivals, and released a new free single "She Rules" which was accompanied by a DIY music video filmed on a mobile phone. In the same year, she relocated to Los Angeles and set up Girl Gang, an online support and networking hub for the feminist community. She co-wrote the song "Poison" which was a UK number 3 hit for Rita Ora in 2015. Later that year, Nash discovered that her manager, Gary Marella, had been stealing large sums of money from her, which resulted in near-bankruptcy. To try to recover financially, she went on to work for the comics store Meltdown in Los Angeles and started selling her clothes as second hand. Nash pressed legal charges against Marella and he was eventually ordered to pay her back the stolen money.

2016–2019: GLOW and Yesterday Was Forever 

In 2016, Nash released a standalone single "Good Summer", followed by "My Little Alien" which was written about a dog she had adopted. In April 2017, she launched a Kickstarter campaign to finance a fourth studio album and released an EP, Agenda, promoted by the single "Call Me". She joined the cast of a Netflix series GLOW telling a fictionalized story of the 1980s women's professional wrestling promotion, the Gorgeous Ladies of Wrestling (GLOW), where she played Rhonda "Britannica" Richardson. The series premiered in June 2017 to a very positive reception and was renewed for further three seasons. In August she embarked on a UK tour to mark the 10th anniversary of her debut album.

Nash's fourth studio album, Yesterday Was Forever, was released independently on 30 March 2018, preceded by the singles "Drink About You" and "Life in Pink". It received mixed to positive reviews from critics, but was not a commercial success and failed to chart. To promote the album, Nash toured the United States, Canada and the UK. In September 2018, Kate Nash: Underestimate the Girl, a documentary film by Amy Goldstein, premiered at the LA Film Festival. It follows Kate as she writes her fourth album, and features appearances from Jarrad Kritzstein, Alicia Warrington, and Jeff Ellis, among others. The film was screened at the Pérez Art Museum in Miami and made its UK debut in June 2019 when it was screened at Sheffield's Crucible Theatre and released onto BBC iPlayer. Kate also appeared in a feature film Horrible Histories: The Movie – Rotten Romans and released two new singles in 2019: the grunge-inspired "Trash", in which she condemns environmental pollution, and the pop track "Bad Lieutenant".

2020–present: Nine Sad Symphonies and Only Gold musical 
Following the cancellation of GLOW before its fourth season could be completed due to the COVID-19 pandemic, Nash launched a Patreon page to connect with her fans more directly. She continued working on her fifth studio album, partially inspired by Irish traditional music. In May 2021, she released a new single, "Misery", followed by "Horsie" in September.

In 2022, she released the single "Imperfect" written for the American Netflix series The Baby-Sitters Club, and went on a European tour. In August, she released a new single, "Wasteman", with a music video starring Danny Dyer. In October, the musical Only Gold had its world premiere at the MCC Theatre in New York City, featuring a score by Nash and book by Andy Blankenbuehler and Ted Malawer. Nash also starred in the production. Her fifth studio album, Nine Sad Symphonies, was confirmed as completed and set for release in 2023.

Artistry and style 
Nash's biggest musical influences include Hole, citing their 1994 record Live Through This as her favourite album. She is also influenced by riot grrrl group Bikini Kill, crediting lead vocalist Kathleen Hanna as her idol. Nash is also a fan of Arctic Monkeys. She appeared alongside the band in the documentary Evidently... John Cooper Clarke where she discussed the influence of John Cooper Clarke's poetry upon her lyrics, singling out the song "Foundations" in particular. Kate has also cited M.I.A. as inspiration, claiming she was her favourite artist in 2014. Some of her earlier influences include Buzzcocks, Celine Dion, the Spice Girls, Nirvana, Mis-Teeq, the Beatles, Pink, Blink-182, and Sum 41.

Beginning in the Girl Talk album era, Kate started to incorporate elements of punk rock and grunge into her work as well as 1990s-inspired visuals, notably in the music videos "She Rules" and "Trash". She is also known for retaining her thick London accent when she sings and makes no attempt to sing in an American accent. Her music was used as part of an exhibition at the British Library which traced the history of Cockney English. The exhibition, which ran from November 2010 to April 2011, used Nash's music to demonstrate today's younger urban mode of Cockney English.

Nash is a natural redhead but dyed her hair black for her role in the film Greetings from Tim Buckley, and subsequently maintained two-tone black and blonde hair to promote the 2013 album Girl Talk. In April 2014, she dyed her hair pink for her performance at Coachella Festival. Between 2015 and 2016, she would dye her hair platinum blond, but she eventually returned to her natural red hair for the role of Rhonda "Britannica" Richardson in the Netflix series GLOW, and for her 2018 album Yesterday Was Forever. She often wears punk-inspired jewelry, such as earrings made of safety pins and razor blades.

Activism 
In September 2009, Nash helped to raise funds for five-year-old Tilly Lockey, who lost her hands due to meningococcal disease. She used an auction on eBay to help donate money to Lockey's parents so that she could afford a pair of prosthetic hands.

During the 2011 England riots, Nash volunteered to collect donations for those made homeless by riots in Tottenham, setting up her own public donation stand and delivering donations to Tottenham Leisure Centre in her car.

Nash is a vocal feminist and campaigns to fight gender inequality in music industry. She supported the Russian feminist band Pussy Riot during their trial by encouraging her fans to make posters and raise awareness of their situation and, alongside other musicians, signed a letter to the Russian president Vladimir Putin demanding the release of the imprisoned band. In 2013, she became the Global Ambassador for the movement Because I Am a Girl and partnered with them for her own campaign, Protect a Girl.

Nash is a supporter of the LGBT community and has a large LGBT following, especially lesbians. She described her 2010 song "I've Got a Secret" as "an anti-homophobic rant".

Personal life 
Nash began dating Ryan Jarman in 2007, frontman of The Cribs, after meeting while they were both guests on an episode of the music television programme Later... with Jools Holland that year. The pair were reported to be planning to get married in early 2009, but Jarman announced in March 2012 that they had broken up, in part due to his struggle with anorexia and other psychological problems.

In 2008, following intensive touring, Nash had what she described as a "proper breakdown", including a relapse of the mild OCD which she had experienced as a child. She has been open about her mental health problems and struggles with anxiety.

Nash became a vegan in 2017, having been a vegetarian since 2009. Her decision was prompted by watching the film Okja.

Discography 

 Made of Bricks (2007)
 My Best Friend Is You (2010)
 Girl Talk (2013)
 Yesterday Was Forever (2018)

Filmography

Awards and nominations 

On 20 February 2008, Nash received a Brit Award for Best Female Artist.

References

External links 

Official YouTube channel

1987 births
Living people
21st-century English actresses
21st-century English women singers
21st-century English singers
21st-century British guitarists
21st-century English bass guitarists
Anti-folk musicians
Brit Award winners
English activists
English expatriates in the United States
English women guitarists
English guitarists
English women pop singers
English feminists
English film actresses
English keyboardists
English people of Irish descent
English women singer-songwriters
English television actresses
Women bass guitarists
Women rock singers
Feminist musicians
Fiction Records artists
Labour Party (UK) people
English LGBT rights activists
NME Awards winners
People educated at the BRIT School
People from Harrow, London
Moshi Moshi Records artists
Geffen Records artists
Dine Alone Records artists
Women punk rock singers
21st-century women guitarists